Dapu Khan Mirasi was a Rajasthani Folk singer known for entertaining tourists from India and abroad in the fort of Jaisalmer over 30 years. He died at the age of 62 on March 13, 2021, after reportedly suffering a heart attack. Dapu is one of the very few exponents of the Kamaicha, which is often termed as one of the oldest bowed instruments in the world.

Life 
Khan lived in Bhadli Village, 127 km from Jaisalmer City in Fatehgarh District.

Death 
Dapu Khan died on March 13, 2021, due to a heart attack.

References

External links 
 Dapu Khan & Group at Anahad Foundation

1950s births
2021 deaths
Indian folk singers
Indian male folk singers
People from Rajkot district